"Pacifier" is the sixth single by Welsh indie rock band Catfish and the Bottlemen. The song was the fourth and final track on their extended play, Kathleen and the Other Three and the fifth track on their debut studio album, The Balcony. The single was released on 1 December 2014. The single did not contain a B-side.

Music video 
The music video was exclusively released through Clash magazine on 3 October 2014. The band subsequently released the music video on their YouTube and Vevo pages on 5 October 2014.

Track listing

Certifications

References

External links 
 Pacifier - Catfish and the Bottlemen at Discogs

2014 singles
2014 songs
Catfish and the Bottlemen songs
Island Records singles
Song recordings produced by Jim Abbiss